The Sumba buttonquail (Turnix everetti) is a species of bird in the family Turnicidae. The scientific name commemorates British colonial administrator and zoological collector Alfred Hart Everett.

Distribution and habitat
It is endemic to Sumba Island in the Lesser Sundas of Indonesia. Its natural habitats are dry savanna, subtropical or tropical moist shrubland, subtropical or tropical dry lowland grassland, and arable land. It is threatened by habitat loss.

References

External links
BirdLife Species Factsheet.

Sumba buttonquail
Birds of Sumba
Sumba buttonquail
Taxonomy articles created by Polbot
Taxa named by Ernst Hartert